Sir Martin Browne ffolkes, 1st Baronet, FRS (21 May 1749 – 11 December 1821) was an English baronet and Member of Parliament.

Martin ffolkes was the only son of William ffolkes, a barrister of Hillington, Norfolk and his second wife Mary, the daughter and heiress of Sir William Browne, MD, President of the Royal College of Physicians. His uncle was Martin Folkes, President of the Royal Society.

He was educated at Eton School from 1758 to 1766 and Emmanuel College, Cambridge and then entered Lincoln's Inn in 1768 to study law. He succeeded his father in 1783, inheriting lands in Norfolk. On the death of his grandfather Sir William Browne in 1774 he restyled himself Browne ffolkes and was created a baronet later that year.

He was appointed High Sheriff of Norfolk for 1783–84 and in 1790 was elected MP for King's Lynn, sitting until his death in office in 1821.

He was elected a Fellow of the Royal Society in 1772.

He died at Hillington in 1821 and was succeeded by his elder son, William John Henry Browne ffolkes. He had married Fanny, the daughter and coheir of Sir John Turner, 3rd Baronet of Warham, with whom he had 2 sons and 3 daughters.

References

1749 births
1821 deaths
People educated at Eton College
Alumni of Emmanuel College, Cambridge
Members of Lincoln's Inn
High Sheriffs of Norfolk
Fellows of the Royal Society
Baronets in the Baronetage of Great Britain
Members of the Parliament of the United Kingdom for English constituencies
British MPs 1790–1796
British MPs 1796–1800
UK MPs 1801–1802
UK MPs 1802–1806
UK MPs 1806–1807
UK MPs 1807–1812
UK MPs 1812–1818
UK MPs 1818–1820
UK MPs 1820–1826
People from Hillington, Norfolk